1. Main Jet Base Command is affiliated to Combat Air Force and Air Missile Defense Command. It is located in Eskişehir. The 401st Test Fleet Command, is also located at this base where locally produced and developed weapons and ammunition are tested.

References 

Eskişehir Province
Turkish Air Force bases